The following article is about the Loja Canton. For the Loja Province, see Loja Province and for the city, see Loja, Ecuador.

Loja Canton is located in the southeast of the Province of Loja bordering the Podocarpus National Park and the Province of Zamora-Chinchipe in the east and south, and the cantons of Saraguro in the north, Catamayo, Gonzanama, and Quilanga in the west.  The principal city is Loja which is also the provincial capital.  It is also home to Vilcabamba, the "Valley of Longevity."

Demographics
Ethnic groups as of the Ecuadorian census of 2010:
Mestizo  90.2%
White  3.5%
Indigenous  2.6%
Afro-Ecuadorian  2.5%
Montubio  1.1%
Other  0.1%

Sights
 City of Loja
 National Shrine of Our Lady of El Cisne.
 Reynaldo Espinoza Botanical Gardens (one of the world's highest-altitude botanical gardens, at 2100m)
 The Incan ruins of de Ciudadela, Quinara, Taranza, and Llano Grande.

Traditional celebrations
 Border Integration Fair, September 8
 Province Day, September 18
 Independence of Loja, November 18
 Founding of Loja, December 8

References 

Cantons of Loja Province